NH 1B may refer to:

 National Highway 1B (India, old numbering)
 New Hampshire Route 1B, United States